Vidhi is a 2017 Indian-Tamil-language family soap opera starring Sreeja, Rashmi Jayraj, Vibhu Raman, Ravi Raj, Surjith Ansary and Anu. It replaced Nijangal and was broadcast on Sun TV on Monday to Saturday from 6 March 2017 to 20 January 2018 at 1:00PM (IST) for 301 episodes. It was produced by San Media Ltd and directed by Stalin Iniya. The title track was composed by Dhina and sung by Karthik and Rita with lyrics by Vairamuthu. It ended on 20 January 2018.

Synopsis

Vidhi is a Tamil romance and drama written by Thavan Suppaiya and Marudhu Shankar, who also wrote the dialogues for the characters. Lydia Paul developed the story, and Stalin Iniya and Guru Balan directed it. A typical Tamil soap which involves love, heartbreak, and romance, this won the hearts of the Tamil audience.

It aired on Sun TV on March 6, 2017, and it starts from 1 pm. The title track and songs were written and composed by Dhina and Vairamuthu. Karthik, the Tamil singer, sang the song "Vidhiye Vidhiye" as his debut. The characters are Nila played by Sreeja, Reshmi, Raghu played by Jegathish, and Ravi Raj, along with Azhagesan, Maragadham, and Dhinesh. They are the ones that play the leading roles and are vital to this show.

Nila is a housewife who is married to Raghu. Due to private reasons, both cannot bring a child into the world, so they decide to adopt one from an unmarried lady, Diya. Her husband Siddharth agrees to the adoption, but the twist arises when Raghu's sister, Chitra marries him.

Problems find their way into this household as everyone notices the awkwardness of having the adopted child and his father in the same family but with different relations. The feeling turns into discontentment, and slowly it becomes resentment between the two parties. Diya is not happy with her husband getting remarried, that too with a close relative of the parent who adopted her child.

The animosity grows in the household and the feelings turn into verbal insults and abuses on each other as they try to manage the situation. Siddharth is attracted to Chitra, and they are not willing to separate when her brother tries to convince her. Meanwhile, they consider taking away his child, but it is more complicated than that as the adoption papers are already signed, and the agency managed the entire process.

To keep the child, the families must come to a consensus. They should be in agreement with each other. But staying calm is something that seems impossible in these situations. As the show goes on, the viewers can only be updated with each episode and find out what happens next.

Cast

Main cast

 Sreeja as Dr.Nila Raghu
 Rashmi Jayraj as Dhiya Dev
 Vibhu Raman as Raghu
 Karan Sagar as Dev

Additional cast

 Parthi as Magesh
 Ravi Raj
 Bombay Babu as Azhagesan
 Revathy Shankar as Maragadham
 Surjith Ansary as Dhinesh
 Anu as Chithira
 Yuvasri
 Sarath Chandra
 Mounica Devi
 Anitha
 Hemalatha
 Lenin Anpan
 Devipriya as Punithavathi
 Haripriya Vignesh Kumar as Mythili
 Sripriya
 Hema Rajkumar
 Shayrin
 David
 Surender
 Rajesh
 Vairavaraj

Title song
The title suntv
song was written by lyricist Vairamuthu, composed by Dhina and sung by Karthik and Rita.

Soundtrack

Production
The series was directed by Stalin Iniya. It was produced by San Media Ltd, along with the production crew of 2004-2017 Sun TV serials Ahalya (2004-2006), Bandham (2006-2009), Uravugal (2009-2012) and Bommalattam (2012-2016).

International broadcast
The Series was released on 6 March 2017 on Sun TV alongside Mahalakshmi and Sumangali, the series also airs on Sun TV HD. The series was also broadcast internationally on Channel's international distribution. 
 It aired in Sri Lanka, South East Asia, Middle East, United States, Canada, Europe, Oceania, South Africa and Sub Saharan Africa on Sun TV.
 It is also available via the internet protocol television service, Lebara Play and YuppTV.

References

External links 
 Official Website 
 Sun TV on YouTube
 Sun TV Network 
 Sun Group 

Sun TV original programming
2010s Tamil-language television series
2017 Tamil-language television series debuts
Tamil-language television shows
2018 Tamil-language television series endings